Charles Hassall (1863 – after 1889) was an English footballer who played for Stoke.

Career
Hassall played for Judes before he joined Stoke in 1888. He was a member of Stoke's reserve side the 'Swifts' and was overlooked by manager Harry Lockett for the first team. His only senior appearance came in the FA Cup against Warwick County. Stoke lost and most of the reserve players including Hassall were released. He later went on to play for Leek.

Career statistics

References

1863 births
Year of death missing
Footballers from Stoke-on-Trent
English footballers
Association football goalkeepers
Stoke City F.C. players
Leek F.C. players